Hyundai Doosan Infracore Co., Ltd., formerly known as Doosan Infracore, is a South Korean company that manufactures construction equipment and engine. It is one of the largest construction equipment manufacturers by sales revenue. Doosan Infracore was acquired by Hyundai Heavy Industries Group in 2021.

History

Daewoo Heavy Industries

Daewoo Heavy Industries was founded in 1937 as Chosun Machine Works when Korea was under Japanese rule. After Japan's withdrawal from Korea, the company was nationalized by the government and was transformed into a public company in 1963 as Hankook Machine Industrial. In 1969, Hankook Machine was privatized after being sold to Shinjin Group. In 1975, the company began producing diesel engines with financial support from the German government and technical collaboration with MAN SE.

However, the company was financially strapped due to the lack of domestic demand and unstable direction, and Shinjin had to sell the company back to a government-controlled bank. Then, in 1976, Daewoo Industrial and its affiliates purchased a 44.8% stake in the total share and changed the name to Daewoo Heavy Industries.

Doosan Infracore

During the financial crisis in 1997, Daewoo collapsed, and its affiliates were sold to other companies. Daewoo Heavy's shareholders first approved separating the firm's shipbuilding and machinery operations into stand-alone companies, Daewoo Shipbuilding & Marine Engineering and Daewoo Heavy Industries & Machinery. In 2005, Korea Development Bank and Korea Asset Management Corporation chose a consortium led by Doosan Heavy Industries as a prime bidder for Daewoo Heavy and officially signed a contract. After the acquisition, Daewoo Heavy was renamed Doosan Infracore.

Doosan Infracore expanded the heavy equipment business by acquiring global players. In March 2007, the company acquired Yantai Yuhua Machinery, a wheel loader maker, for 22 million yuan. Doosan recorded South Korea's largest international acquisition by purchasing Bobcat and other construction equipment units from Ingersoll Rand for $4.9 billion in November 2007. Doosan's European subsidiary took over Norwegian dump trucks firm Moxy Engineering for €55 million in 2008.

Hyundai Doosan Infracore
Alike Daewoo in 1997, Doosan Group also faced a liquidity crisis due to years of declining orders amid an economic slowdown. Doosan decided to sell a stake held by Doosan Heavy in Doosan Infracore to improve its financial structure. In 2021, Hyundai Heavy Industries Group purchased a 35 percent stake in Doosan Infracore for 850 billion won. However, Doosan Infracore's 51 percent stake in Doosan Bobcat was not included as part of the sale.

See also
 Daewoo dissolution and corruption scandal

References

External links
 

Companies based in Incheon
Companies listed on the Korea Exchange
South Korean companies established in 2000
Hyundai Heavy Industries Group